Tolnau:
 German name of the Tolna County
 German name of Tolna, a town in Tolna County
 German name of Vértestolna

See also 
 Tolna (disambiguation)